Started in 1962, the Canadian-Wide Science Fair (CWSF) is an annual science fair in Canada coordinated by Youth Science Canada. Finalists qualify from approximately 25,000 competitors at over 100 Youth Science Canada-affiliated regional science fairs in every province and territory, or, in the province of Quebec, the provincial science fair.

Competition is split into three age/grade categories: Junior for grades 7 and 8, Intermediate for grades 9 and 10, and Senior for grades 11, 12 and Cégep.

The Canada-Wide Science Fair is a weeklong event. Students travel with their respective regional representatives to the designated location (listed below). The Canada-Wide Science Fair has been held every year since 1962. The Canada-Wide Science Fair was presented by Blackberry from 2012 through 2014.

History

The First Canada-Wide Science Fair was held May 11 and 12, 1962 at the Science Building at Carleton University in Ottawa. In 1962, the fair was co-sponsored by the Kiwanis Club of Ottawa Incorporated. The initial Headquarters for the Canadian Science Fairs Council was 45 Rideau Street, Ottawa. The two-day science fair was made up of 45 exhibits of regional winners from secondary school fairs across the country.

The 2020 Canada-Wide Science Fair in Edmonton, Alberta was cancelled due to concerns over the COVID-19 pandemic: the cancellation was the first time that Youth Science Canada had ever cancelled the fair. Next year saw its return on a virtual basis.

Intel International Science and Engineering Fair (Intel ISEF) 
Several competitors and winners from the Canada-Wide Science Fair have been selected for competition at the Intel International Science and Engineering Fair as part of Team Canada, among them inventors Ann Makosinski and Alex Deans. Past Canada-Wide Science Fair winners Raymond Wang and Austin Wang both from Vancouver, BC, won the Gordon E. Moore award at Intel ISEF in 2015 and 2016, respectively.

Awards 
Almost $1 million in awards and scholarships is given out each year at the Canada-Wide Science Fair.
Bronze, silver, and gold medals are awarded to outstanding projects in each age/grade category (see above). Challenge awards are presented for the best project in each of seven STEM challenges (discovery, energy, environment, health, information, innovation and resources) for each age/grade category. Sponsored special awards are also offered.
Three Grand Awards recognize the top project from the gold medal winners in each age/grade category: The Best Project Award (including $2,500 cash) is presented to the top overall project, regardless of category. The top projects from the two remaining categories receive Platinum Awards, which include $1,000 cash. Two or three of the platinum award winners compete at the European Union Contest for Young Scientists.

Host Cities 

Below is a list of host cities of the Canada Wide Science Fair.

References

External links 
 
 Youth Science Canada

Educational organizations based in Ontario
Annual fairs
Scientific organizations based in Canada
Pickering, Ontario
Competitions in Canada
Science competitions
Fairs in Canada
Science events in Canada
Annual events in Canada
1962 establishments in Canada
Recurring events established in 1962